Chrono Quest (Explora in France) is an adventure game released in September 1988 for the Amiga and Atari ST. It was developed by French developer Infomedia and published by 16/32 Diffusion in France and Psygnosis in the United Kingdom. Chrono Quest is an historical adventure where the player (accused of murdering their father) travels to different time periods on a quest to find their father's true murderer. The box art was designed by Roger Dean.

The game received mixed reviews from video game critics. A sequel to the game, Chrono Quest 2, was released in 1989. Explora III: Sous le signe du serpent was never released in English, but saw a French release in 1990.

Gameplay

Reception

Chrono Quest received mixed reviews from video game critics.

Chrono Quest 2 had a similar critical reception.

References

External links
 
 Chrono Quest at Atari Mania
 Chrono Quest at Lemon Amiga

1988 video games
Adventure games
Amiga games
Atari ST games
Psygnosis games
Video games scored by David Whittaker
Video games developed in France